The 1968 Westmar Eagles football team was an American football team that represented Westmar College—later known as Westmar University—as a member of the Tri-State Conference during the 1968 NAIA football season . Led by Jack Scott in his eighth season as head coach, the team compiled a perfect record of 9–0, winning the Tri-State Conference title with a 6–0 mark. It was the fifth straight Tri-State championship for the Eagles and the program's first perfect season since 1911.

Schedule

References

Westmar
Westmar Eagles football seasons
Tri-State Conference (1960–1981) football champion seasons
College football undefeated seasons
Westmar Eagles football